Niederweningen railway station is a terminal railway station in the Swiss canton of Zürich and municipality of Niederweningen. The station is located on the Wehntal railway line close to the border of both the municipality and the canton, and serves as the terminus of Zürich S-Bahn line S15.

Niederweningen station, and the end of the line, was originally located closer to the centre of Niederweningen, at the location now occupied by Niederweningen Dorf station. In 1938 the line was extended approximately  towards the cantonal boundary to serve the company Bucher Industries, and the new terminus retained the name of the previous terminus.

The station has a modern station building, which also incorporates a convenience store that is part of the Migrolino chain owned the Migros company. The Bucher Industries, a manufacturer of agriculture and industrial machinery, is not anymore served by the railway, however some sidings are still visible.

Services 
The following services stop at Niederweningen:

References

External links 
 
 

Railway stations in the canton of Zürich
Swiss Federal Railways stations
Niederweningen